History of Philosophy may refer to:

 History of philosophy, a discipline which investigates the process of the history of philosophy
 A History of Philosophy, a book by Frederick Charles Copleston
 A History of Western Philosophy, a book by Bertrand Russell